Aglaia rubrivenia is a species of plant in the family Meliaceae. It is found in Papua New Guinea and the Solomon Islands.

References

rubrivenia
Vulnerable plants
Taxonomy articles created by Polbot